The 2020 Continental Cup of Curling was held from January 9 to 12 at the Western Fair Sports Centre in London, Ontario. The Continental Cup is a curling competition pitting Team Canada against Team Europe in a series of team events, mixed doubles events, and skins competitions.

Team Europe won and collected CAD$135,000 prize money, while Team Canada collected CAD$67,500.

Teams 
Six teams from each region will compete:

Results
All times listed are in Eastern Standard Time (UTC−5).

Thursday, January 9

Draw 1
Team
9:30 am

Draw 2
Mixed Doubles
2:00 pm

Draw 3
Team
7:30 pm

Friday, January 10

Draw 4
Team Scramble
9:30 am

Draw 5
Mixed Doubles
2:00 pm

Draw 6
Team Scramble
7:30 pm

Saturday, January 11

Draw 7
Mixed Scramble (Male Skips)
9:30 am

Draw 8
Mixed Doubles
2:00 pm

Draw 9
Mixed Scramble (Female Skips)
7:30 pm

Sunday, January 12

Draw 10
Skins
2:00 pm

Draw 11
Skins
7:00 pm

References

External links 

Continental Cup of Curling
2020 in Canadian curling
Curling in Ontario
Sports competitions in London, Ontario
International curling competitions hosted by Canada
Continental Cup
2020 in Ontario